Antoniewo may refer to the following places:
Antoniewo, Aleksandrów County in Kuyavian-Pomeranian Voivodeship (north-central Poland)
Antoniewo, Włocławek County in Kuyavian-Pomeranian Voivodeship (north-central Poland)
Antoniewo, Żnin County in Kuyavian-Pomeranian Voivodeship (north-central Poland)
Antoniewo, Ostrów Mazowiecka County in Masovian Voivodeship (east-central Poland)
Antoniewo, Sierpc County in Masovian Voivodeship (east-central Poland)
Antoniewo, Żuromin County in Masovian Voivodeship (east-central Poland)
Antoniewo, Greater Poland Voivodeship (west-central Poland)
Antoniewo, Pomeranian Voivodeship (north Poland)
Antoniewo, Warmian-Masurian Voivodeship (north Poland)

See also
 Antoniew (disambiguation)